We Don't Have to Be Alone is This Condition's second release, a five-song EP, recorded in August/September 2008.  It was released on November 18, 2008 through online retailers and digital music stores (iTunes).  Recorded in Hicksville, NY's Killingsworth Studios under producer Anthony Santonocito, the album features a new recording of "Red Letter", previously only released in a demo.  The song "Barefoot (Steve's Song)" contains a hidden, sing-along track after the conclusion of the song, of a group of people singing the chorus to the first song on the album, The Timing.

Tracks
"The Timing" - 3:09
"Red Letter" - 3:41
"Some Nights Just Feel Right" - 4:01
"I'm No Hero" - 4:16
"Barefoot (Steve's Song)" - 5:15

References

2008 EPs
This Condition albums